is a stadium located in the city of Suita, Osaka Prefecture, Japan. It has a capacity of 39,694. The official name is Suita City Football Stadium and is used for international matches such as the World Cup qualifiers.

The stadium is home of the J1 League football club Gamba Osaka since 2016 and replaced Expo '70 Commemorative Stadium, which had been their main stadium between 1991 and 2015.

Panasonic, whose headquarters are located in the nearby city of Kadoma, acquired the naming rights and the stadium is known as Panasonic Stadium Suita since January 1, 2018.

International match

References

External links

 Gamba Osaka 
 J.League 

Sports venues in Osaka Prefecture
Football venues in Japan
Gamba Osaka
Sports venues completed in 2015
Suita
Venues of the 2026 Asian Games
2015 establishments in Japan
Panasonic